Bilkent University is a foundation university located in Ankara, Turkey. It was founded by Prof. İhsan Doğramacı in 1984, with the aim of creating a center of excellence in higher education and research. It is constantly ranked among the top Turkish universities since its establishment. In 2011, it was listed as the top 112th university in the world by The World University Rankings. Bilkent University was modeled after Harvard University and was the first non-profit private university established in the country. The name Bilkent is an abbreviation of bilim kenti: Turkish for "city of science".

History 
Preparations for the establishment of the university began in 1967, with the purchase of a tract of land to the west of Ankara. In the late 1970s the foundations of the buildings which now house administrative offices, the faculty of engineering, and the library, were laid. Construction of residences for academic staff, cafeterias, student dormitories, and various academic buildings followed rapidly.

Campus 

The university occupies three campuses. They are located about 12 km west of the center of Ankara, and cover a total area of more than 300 hectares.

Library 
The university library houses a large collection of books with annual acquisitions valued at over 3 million U.S. dollars. As of 2017, Bilkent University Library is the largest university library of Turkey, and it is the only university library to rank in the top 10 libraries in the country.

In addition to books, the collection includes periodical subscriptions, microforms, CD-ROM, access to numerous online databases and electronic journals, DVD, VHS and audio cassettes. Sheet music and sound recordings are available in the music rooms. The library also hosts a number of  private collections and an exhibition hall.

Academics 
The university offers 33 undergraduate majors, together with 32 graduate programs spanning 22 different fields.

Faculties 
 Faculty of Applied Sciences
 Faculty of Art, Design and Architecture
 Faculty of Business Administration
 Faculty of Economics, Administrative and Social Sciences
 Faculty of Education
 Faculty of Engineering
 Faculty of Humanities and Letters
 Faculty of Law
 Faculty of Music and Performing Arts
 Faculty of Science

Schools 
 School of Applied Languages
 School of Applied Technology and Management
 Vocational School of Computer Technology and Office Management
 Vocational School of Tourism and Hotel Services

Rankings 

The Times Higher Education World University Rankings consistently ranks Bilkent University as one of the top universities in Turkey.

Bilkent, as a university with less than 50 years of history, is also ranked as one of the most prestigious younger universities in the world:

THE powered by Thomson Reuters ranked Bilkent in the category BRICS & Emerging Economies as follows:

Bilkent University is particularly noted for the quality of its Faculty of Engineering. The Times Higher Education World University Rankings rank Bilkent among the top 100 universities for Engineering and Technology, which makes it the only university in Turkey to make it to the top 100 in a subject list, as follows:

The Faculty of Business Administration of Bilkent University was the first business school in Turkey to be accredited by AACSB; less than 5% of the business schools around the world have received this accreditation. The business school has been ranked by Eduniversal among the best business schools of the Eurasia region for international influence.

According to the QS World University Rankings of 2012 and 2013 the university ranks in the 151–200 range in the subject of "Economics & Econometrics".

Student life

Sports 
Students can participate in many sports courses and be trained by university staff, mostly for free. The university presents many individuals and teams in different sports in varsity competitions. The most well-known sport teams of the university are the Bilkent Goats and the Bilkent Judges, the ultimate team and the football team, respectively.

Student unions and clubs 
The board and the departmental members of the Bilkent Student Union are chosen annually among all registered university students. The Student Union is the main sponsor and the organizer of  Mayfest, the traditional Bilkent University summer festival. Various student clubs organize regular activities every day on and off the campus, mostly open to everyone. All students are allowed to join, or participate in the events and activities of any club they wish to. Student union and club activities are coordinated under the supervision of Student Events Center of Bilkent.

Recreation 
Bilkent University is host to numerous events regarding music and the performing arts. The university also sponsors frequent lectures, art exhibitions, and literary evenings throughout the academic year. During the first week of may, each year Mayfest is held. Mayfest is a well-known festival among the youth of Ankara, consisting of a large number of activities, as well as open-air concerts where renowned Turkish pop and rock bands and singers take the stage every night throughout the week.

Noted people

Faculty 

 István Aranyosi - Faculty of Humanities and Letters
 Gürer Aykal - Faculty of Music, conductor
 Suna Kan - Faculty of Music, violinist
 Gülsin Onay - Faculty of Music, pianist
 Fazıl Say - Faculty of Music, pianist
 Jason Hale - Faculty of Music and Performing Arts-Theatre Department Chair, actor/director
 Talat Sait Halman (deceased in 2014)- Dean of the School of Humanities and Letters, first Minister of Culture of Turkey
 Stanford J. Shaw (deceased in 2006) - Faculty of History
 Halil İnalcık - Faculty of History
 Norman Stone - Faculty of International Relations, and History
 Hikmet Sami Türk - Faculty of Law, former Minister of Justice of Turkey
 İlber Ortaylı - Faculty of Law
 Sami Selçuk - Faculty of Law, former Head Judge of the Supreme Court of Turkey
 Hilmi Volkan Demir - Faculty of Science, Department of Physics, and Faculty of Engineering, Department of Electrical and Electronics Engineering, Director of UNAM
 Abdullah Atalar - Faculty of Engineering, Department of Electrical and Electronics Engineering
 Orhan Aytür - Faculty of Engineering, Department of Electrical and Electronics Engineering
 Erdal Arikan - Founder of Polar Codes, Faculty of Engineering, Department in Electrical and Electronics Engineering 
 Mustafa Akgül (deceased in 2017) - School of Applied Technology and Management, Department of Computer Technology and Information Systems

Alumni

 Başak Köklükaya - actress
 Binnur Kaya - actress
 Demir Demirkan - Rock musician
 Emrah Yucel - Graphic designer and president of the Turkish Film Festival
 Erdem Başçı - Governor of the Central Bank of the Republic of Turkey
 Esra Bilgiç Töre - Actress
 Mete Atatüre - Turkish physicist
 Gizem Girişmen - Disabled female archer. Won gold medal at the 2008 Summer Paralympics in the category of individual recurve W1/W2
 Gizem Memiç - Former Miss Turkey titleholder who represented Turkey both in Miss Universe and Miss World beauty pageants in 2010.
 Hakan Fidan -  soldier, teacher, diplomat and the Head of National Intelligence Organization (Turkey)
 Haluk Akakçe - Painter and audiovisual artist
 Mevlüt Çavuşoğlu - diplomat and politician; current Minister of Foreign Affairs of Turkey
 Hande Dalkılıç - Pianist
 Sefaattin Tongay - Material Scientist
 Ibrahim Sirkeci - Professor of Transnational Studies and Marketing at Regent's University London
 Kaan Tangöze - Rock musician as known from Duman
 Murat Han - Actor
 Nasuh Mahruki - Mountaineer, first Turk to climb Mt. Everest and the founder of search and rescue team, AKUT
 Nevşin Mengü - News reporter
 Orkut Büyükkökten - employee of Google who developed the social networking service called Orkut
 Şahan Gökbakar - Comedian
 Tamer Karadağlı - Actor
 Tarkan Gözübüyük - Musician as known from Pentagram, Producer
 Vuslat Doğan Sabancı - Chairwoman of Hürriyet
 Yasemin Mori - Musician
 Yiğit Bulut - Journalist and a senior advisor to President Recep Tayyip Erdoğan

Affiliations

Centers 
 National Research Center for Magnetic Resonance (UMRAM)
 Bilkent University Center for European Union Affairs
 Ahmed Adnan Saygun Center for Music Research and Education
 Bilkent Center for Advanced Studies (BICAS)
 Center for Mind, Language & Culture
 Center for Brain Research
 Center for Environmental Sciences
 Center for International Economics
 Center for Russian Studies
 Center for Studies in Society and Politics
 Center for Turkish Language and Speech Processing
 Center for Turkish Politics and History
 Center for Research in Transitional Societies (CRTS)
 Center for Turkish Literature
 Communications and Spectrum Management Research Center (ISYAM)
 Genetics and Biotechnology Research and Development Center (BILGEN)
 Halil Inalcik Center of Ottoman Studies
 Nanotechnology Research Center (NANOTAM)
 National Nanotechnology Research Center (UNAM)
 Bilkent University Computational Electromagnetics Research Center (BiLCEM)

Cyberpark 
Bilkent Cyberpark, founded in 2002, is the fastest growing techno park in Turkey serving with 240 technology-based companies, one micro nano chip factory, five research centers, and 4,00 personnel.

Institutes 
 Institute of Economic and Social Sciences
 Institute of Engineering and Science
 Institute of Fine Arts
 Institute of Music and Performing Arts
 Institute of World Systems, Economies and Strategic Research
 Institute of Materials Science and Nanotechnology

See also 

 List of universities in Ankara
 List of universities in Turkey
 Education in Turkey

References

External links 
 
 
 Bilkent Cyberpark

Bilkent University
1984 establishments in Turkey